Busy Being Born is an album by Gary Lucas, released in 1998 through Tzadik Records. It is an album of children's songs.

Production
"Fleischerei" is a tribute to the soundtracks to Max Fleischer cartoons.

Track listing

Personnel 
Musicians
Greg Cohen – bass guitar
Jonathan Kane – drums
Gary Lucas – vocals, acoustic guitar, electric guitar, steel guitar, production
Production and additional personnel
Larry Fine – vocals on "Adon Olom", "The Mensch in the Moon" and "A Hundred Pounds of Clay"
André Grossmann – photography
Kenny Hurwitz – vocals on "Adon Olom", "The Mensch in the Moon" and "A Hundred Pounds of Clay"
Tim Kalliches – engineering
Misako Kano – piano on "Abie the Fishman"
Ikue Mori – design
Sascha von Oertzen – engineering
Kazunori Sugiyama – production
Irene Trudel – engineering
Allan Tucker – mastering
John Zorn – saxophone on "Adon Olom" and "Sandman"

References 

 

1998 albums
Gary Lucas albums
Tzadik Records albums